Henry Kerr (18 July 1874 – 19 August 1933) was a Jamaican cricketer. He played in two first-class matches for the Jamaican cricket team in 1905/06.

See also
 List of Jamaican representative cricketers

References

External links
 

1874 births
1933 deaths
Jamaican cricketers
Jamaica cricketers
People from Manchester Parish
Migrants from British Jamaica to the United Kingdom